Deosar (Devsar) is a town and tehsil in Singrauli district, Madhya Pradesh, India. It is also an industrial hub. Deosar Tehsil is located on N.H. 39. It is also a Madhya Pradesh Legislative Assembly, part of the Sidhi Lok Sabha constituency.

Deosar belongs to Rewa Division. It is located 55 km west of the district headquarters of Singrauli and 592 km from the state capital of Bhopal towards the east. Deosar Tehsil is bounded by Sihawal Tehsil to the north, Chitrangi Tehsil towards the east, Sidhi Tehsil on the west, and Singrauli Tehsil to the east.

History
Previously it was a part of Singrauli state which was ruled by the Benvanshi Maharajas. Until 2008, it was part of the Sidhi district which was bifurcated to create Singrauli district tehsils, Singrauli, Chitrangi, and Deosar but in 2012, two new tehsils Sarai and Mada were added. It is also known as Bijaura District. Its headquarters is approximately 50 km from Deosar, which has road connectivity.

Geography 
Sidhi, Singrauli, Rewa, Renukoot are the nearby cities to Deosar. It is at an elevation of 394 m. Vindhyachal, Rewa, mada caves, Allahabad, Varanasi (Benares) are the nearby important tourist destinations.

Demographics

Bagheli is the local language. People also speak Hindi and English.

Total population of Deosar Tehsil is 324,363 living in 45,840 houses, spread across a total 225 villages and 98 panchayats. Males are 170,347 and females are 154,016.

Education
Education in Deosar consists of a Government Degree College, Government Girls Higher Secondary School, Government Higher Secondary School in Khadaura, Government Excellence school, Government Model school and Saraswati higher secondary school Deosar.

Tourism 
Locations of interest in Deosar are Ganesh Mandir Khadaura, Shiv Mandir, Dahran Sahuar, Chhiwa Shiv Mandir and Bainakund Temple. Shiv Mandir Majauna,

References

External links
Singrauli District 

Cities and towns in Singrauli district